In jazz, the term upper structure or "upper structure triad" refers to a voicing approach developed by jazz pianists and arrangers defined by the sounding of a major or minor triad in the uppermost pitches of a more complex harmony.

Examples

Example 1: Below, a common voicing used by jazz pianists is given for the chord C79 (C major chord with a minor 7th, and extended with an augmented 9th).

In the lower stave the notes E and B are given. These form a tritone which defines the dominant sound, and are the major 3rd and minor 7th of the C79 chord. 

In the upper stave the notes E, G, and B are given together: these form an E major triad.

This E major triad is what would be called the upper structure. Considered in relation to the root C, the notes of this E major triad function, respectively, as the sharpened ninth (the root of the E major chord), fifth, and seventh in relation to that root. 

(Note: the root C is omitted here, and is often done so by jazz pianists for ease of playing, or because a bass player is present.)

Example 2: The following example illustrates the notes of an F minor triad functioning as part of a C13911 chord (C major chord with a minor 7th, minor 9th, augmented 11th, and major 13th):

In relation to the root of C, the C (enharmonic with D) functions as the minor 9th, the F as the augmented 11th, and the A as the major 13th, respectively.

Application

Determining which additional pitches can be juxtaposed with the chord is achieved by considering the relationship between a particular chord and the scale it implies. An example follows:

The chord C13911 contains the following notes, from the root upwards: C, E, G, B, D, F, A;
The following octatonic scale contains all of these pitches, and fits/matches up with the C13911 chord: C–D–D–E–F–G–A–B–C; these scale elements form a pool from which melodic and harmonic devices might be devised.

Shorthand notation

Common jazz parlance refers to upper structures by way of the interval between the root of the bottom chord and the root of the triad juxtaposed above it. For instance, in example one above (C79) the triad of E major is a (compound) minor 3rd away from C (root of the bottom chord). Thus, this upper structure can be called upper structure flat three, or USIII for short.  

Other possible upper structures are: 

USII – e.g. D major over C7, resulting in C1311
USV – e.g. G major over C7, resulting in C7911
USVI – e.g. A major over C7, resulting in C7913
USVI – e.g. A major over C7, resulting in C139
USi – e.g. C minor over C7, resulting in C79
USii – e.g. D minor over C7, resulting in C7913
USiii – e.g. E minor over C7, resulting in C7911

The second item in the list above (C7911) has a related version called upper structure sharp four minor--with the written shorthand USiv--created with an F minor triad. (See "Example 2" above.)

See also
Extended harmony
Jazz chord
Jazz scales
Polychord
Chordioid

References

Chords
Jazz techniques
Jazz terminology